Greater good may refer to:

Film and television
 The Greater Good (film), a 2011 film regarding adverse reactions to vaccines
 Spooks: The Greater Good, a 2015 film based on the Spooks TV series
 "Greater Good" (CSI: NY)
 "The Greater Good" (House)
 "The Greater Good" (Lost)
 "The Greater Good" (Stargate Universe)

Music
 The Greater Good, or the Passion of Boule de Suif, an opera by Stephen Hartke
 A Greater Good (History 1998–2008), an album by Neuroticfish
 "The Greater Good", a song by Nine Inch Nails from Year Zero

See also 
 Common good
 Greater Good Science Center, a research center at the University of California, Berkeley
 Utilitarianism